Chogha Golan is an aceramic Neolithic archaeological site in the foothills of the Zagros Mountains in Iran, about  from the right bank of the Konjan Cham River. The people of Chogha Golan relied primarily on the exploitation of wild plants and hunting. Chogha Golan is notable for the early presence of domesticated emmer wheat, dating to around 9,800 BP as such the archaeobotanical remains from Chogha Golan shows the earliest record of long-term plant management in Iran.

Archaeology
Chogha Golan contains  of cultural deposits. Archaeologists have divided the site into 11 layers, Archaeological Horizons I-XI. Excavations have unveiled red-painted plaster floors and mudbrick walls. 10 clay animal figurines were excavated at the site.

Archaeobotany
With more than 100,000 analyzed charred botanical items, the high density of seed and chaff remains at Chogha Golan is notable when compared to contemporary sites and even later, Bronze Age sites. 110 different species of plants have been discovered at Chogha Golan. The plant assemblage is dominated by specimens from the Poaceae and Fabaceae families: wild barley, Aegilops, lentil, Lathyrus, Pisum and Vicia. In addition to domesticated emmer wheat, the wild varieties of several Neolithic founder crops were discovered at the site: barley, lentil and pea.

Wild barley was found at every layer at Chogha Golan, starting with Archaeological Horizon XI. Before the appearance of domesticated emmer wheat, wild barley was the predominant cereal found at Chogha Golan, while wheat was rarely found. After around 2000 years, domesticated emmer first appears at Archaeological Horizon II and is also found in Archaeological Horizon I.  After the initial appearance of domesticated emmer wheat, it became the predominant cereal grain found at the site.

Fauna
The faunal assemblage at Chogha Golan is dominated by ungulates (mostly sheep/goat but also gazelle, red deer, pig, and cattle), followed by fish. The remains of tortoise, hedgehog, red fox, and Eurasian lynx are also found.

Notes

References

2009 archaeological discoveries
Archaeological sites in Iran
National works of Iran
Prehistoric Iran
Neolithic sites of Asia